Ice sledge speed racing at the 1984 Winter Paralympics consisted of 16 events, 8 for men and 8 for women.

Medal summary

Men's events

Women's events

References 

 

1984 Winter Paralympics events
1984